Cavafy Museum is an apartment museum in center Alexandria, Egypt, which formerly was the residence of the Greek poet Constantine P. Cavafy, where he lived most of his life.

Location 
The apartment is located near Alexandria Opera House (Fouad St.), in Attarin division, Alexandria. The street name was Lepsius during Cavafy's life; it was renamed Sharm El Sheikh, then after the museum was opened, the narrow and short street became Cavafy Street, which is quite close to two of the city's most important streets, Fouad St. and Safiya Zaghloul St.

Opening 
The museum started as an initiative approached by Kostis Moskof, who was the cultural attaché at the Greek Embassy in Cairo, and then by the support of businessman G. Stratigakis and other cultural bodies.

The apartment was leased by The Cavafy International Committee in 1991, and opened to the public on 16 November 1992.

The entrance was free until 2014. Now the tickets are 15 L.E. and 5 L.E. for students.

Background 
There are other museums dedicated to Cavafy in other cities, including a newly opened museum in Plaka, Athens.

The poet and his living place were mentioned many times in Lawrence Durrell's Alexandria Quartet, and Where the Tigers Were: Travels through Literary Landscapes by Don Meredith.

Collections 
The small-size museum displays letters, notes and poems written by Cavafy, Many portraits, drawings and photographs of Cavafy and close friends, a room dedicated to writer and close friend Stratis Tsirkas as it was his room when he lived with Cavafy for some time. The apartment has many published books and papers on the author, including many translations in Greek, Arabic, English and other 15 languages, and more than 3,000 scholarly articles.

Gallery

References 

Museums in Alexandria
Biographical museums in Egypt
Museums established in 1991
1991 establishments in Egypt